The Tex Avery Show is an American animated showcase series of Metro-Goldwyn-Mayer and Warner Bros. cartoon shorts prominently by animator Tex Avery (a.k.a. Fred Avery). In between the shorts, Don Kennedy gives short facts about the cartoons. The showcase premiered on the Cartoon Network in 1996 (not long after the Time Warner-Turner merger allowed for common ownership of all but four of Avery's cartoons), and was taken off the air in 2002, while reruns continued to be shown on Cartoon Network until April 11, 2004. It was soon re-broadcast on Boomerang.

List of featured Tex Avery cartoons
 Dangerous Dan McFoo
 Aviation Vacation
 Blitz Wolf
 The Early Bird Dood It!
 Dumb-Hounded
 Red Hot Riding Hood
 Who Killed Who?
 One Ham's Family
 What's Buzzin' Buzzard
 Screwball Squirrel
 Batty Baseball
 Happy-Go-Nutty
 Big Heel-Watha
 The Screwy Truant
 The Shooting of Dan McGoo
 Jerky Turkey
 Swing Shift Cinderella
 Wild and Woolfy
 Of Fox and Hounds
 Lonesome Lenny
 The Hick Chick
 Northwest Hounded Police
 Henpecked Hoboes
 Hound Hunters
 Red Hot Rangers
 Uncle Tom's Cabaña
 Slap Happy Lion
 King-Size Canary
 What Price Fleadom
 Little 'Tinker
 Half-Pint Pygmy
 Lucky Ducky
 The Cat That Hated People
 Bad Luck Blackie
 Sénor Droopy
 The House of Tomorrow
 Doggone Tired
 Wags To Riches
 Little Rural Riding Hood
 Out-Foxed
 The Counterfeit Cat
 Ventriloquist Cat
 The Cuckoo Clock
 Garden Gopher
 The Chump Champ
 The Peachy Cobbler
 Cock-a-Doodle Dog
 Daredevil Droopy
 Droopy's Good Deed
 Symphony in Slang
 Car of Tomorrow
 Droopy's Double Trouble
 Magical Maestro
 One Cab's Family
 Rock-a-Bye Bear
 Little Johnny Jet
 The T.V. of Tomorrow
 The Three Little Pups
 Drag-a-Long Droopy
 Billy Boy
 Homesteader Droopy
 The Farm of Tomorrow
 The Flea Circus
 Dixieland Droopy
 Field and Scream
 The First Bad Man
 Deputy Droopy
 Cellbound
 Millionaire Droopy
 Cat's Meow

See also
 List of programs broadcast by Cartoon Network
 Cartoon Alley
 ToonHeads
 The Bob Clampett Show
 The Popeye Show
 ''The Wacky World of Tex Avery

References

External links
 

1990s American animated television series
1990s American anthology television series
1996 American television series debuts
2000s American animated television series
2000s American anthology television series
2002 American television series endings
American children's animated anthology television series
Cartoon Network original programming
Tex Avery
English-language television shows